North Carolina's 11th Senate district is one of 50 districts in the North Carolina Senate. It has been represented by Republican Lisa Stone Barnes since 2021.

Geography
Since 2023, the district has included all of Nash, Franklin, and Vance counties. The district overlaps with the 7th, 24th, 25th, and 32nd state house districts.

District officeholders since 1975

Election results

2022

2020

2018

2016

2014

2012

2010

2008

2006

2004

2002

2000

References

North Carolina Senate districts
Nash County, North Carolina
Franklin County, North Carolina
Vance County, North Carolina